The 2014–15 Munster Rugby season was Munster's fourteenth season competing in the Pro12, alongside which they also competed in the new European Rugby Champions Cup. It was Anthony Foley's first season as head coach.

Events
On 27 August a document detailing players individual strengths and weaknesses was leaked.	
The email intended only for the management team was accidentally sent to every player in the Munster squad. Players were notified within an hour that the email had been sent to them through human error. Anthony Foley speaking on 3 September said that it is unfortunate that the document was leaked saying "It will never, ever happen again.	
It's unfortunate that it's out in the public domain, something that we do behind closed doors to make us better."

Upgrades to Thomond Park were completed in time for the new season kick off on 5 September against Edinburgh. The creation of a Fan Zone Plaza and introduction of a dedicated Bank of Ireland Family Fun Zone, and face-lift of the Guinness Dug Out bar were among the improvements and changes carried out at the ground. The new Fanzone Plaza was officially opened on 10 October before the match against the Scarlets.	

The season kicked off on 5 September against Edinburgh at Thomond Park, a match that Munster lost 13–14.
Munster secured their first win of the season, a 21–10 away win against Benetton Treviso on 12 September.
The following week on 19 September, Simon Zebo scored a hat-trick of try's against Zebre at Thomond Park as Munser recorded their second win of the season on a 31-5 scoreline.
On 27 September, Munster suffered a second defeat at home in three games when the Ospreys won 19–14.
On 4 October, Munster beat Leinster in Dublin for the first time since 2008 with a 34–23 win at the Aviva Stadium.	
First half try's from James Cronin, Robin Copeland, and an interception try from Ian Keatley gave Munster a 28–9 lead at half time.	
Munster received four yellow cards in the second half.

On 18 October in their first game in the new European Rugby Champions Cup against Sale Sharks, Munster came back from 23-7 down at half-time to win the game 27–26 with a last kick drop-goal from Ian Keatley.
On 24 October in their first home game in the European Rugby Champions Cup, Munster defeated Saracens 14–3 to continue their winning start to the European campaign.

On 6 December in their second home game in the European Rugby Champions Cup, Munster lost 16–9 to Clermont Auvergne, with Clermont becoming the first French team to win a European game at Thomond Park.	
The loss was the third defeat in 53 European games for Munster on their home ground.
Eight days later on 14 December, Munster lost the away game against Clermont by 26–19.	
Ian Keatley's two penalties gave Munster an early lead but two tries from Clermont gave them a 15-6 half-time lead.		
Clermont scored another try in the second half but Munster gained a losing bonus point with a try from Duncan Casey and a late Ian Keatley penalty.

On 17 January, Munster lost 33–10 to Saracens in their second last game in the pool stage, a defeat that meant that they would not qualify for the quarter-finals, only the second time that has happened in seventeen seasons. Saracens had a 23–3 lead at half-time after a disappointing display from Munster.
It is the first time in history that Munster have lost three pool games in succession.

In their final pool game of the European Rugby Champions Cup against Sale Sharks on 25 January at Thomond Park, Munster won by 65–10. Munster scored nine tries in total, eight came in a second half during which they scored 52 points without reply. Munster ended the pool stage with three wins from six games, finishing third behind Clermont and Saracens who both made the last eight.

On 16 May, Munster had a bonus-point 50–27 win against the Newport Gwent Dragons, scoring eight tries which booked a home semi-final against the Ospreys in the Pro12 on 23 May.

On 23 May, Munster defeated the Ospreys by 21–18 to reach the 2015 Pro12 Grand Final on 30 May at the Kingspan Stadium.	
Josh Matavesi looked to have won it for the Ospreys with an injury-time try, but it was ruled out after Rhys Webb had knocked on earlier in the move.

The game was Paul O'Connell's last game for Munster at Thomond Park.
Munster went on to lose the final to Glasgow on a 31-13 scoreline.

Coaching and management staff 2014–15

Senior Playing Squad 2014–15

Internationally capped players in bold.

Players In
 Eusebio Guiñazú from  Bath
 Martin Kelly from  Dublin University
 Shane Buckley promoted from Academy
 Robin Copeland from  Cardiff Blues
 Jonathan Holland promoted from Academy
 Tyler Bleyendaal from  Crusaders
 Andrew Smith from  Brumbies

Players Out
 James Coughlan to  Pau
 Ian Nagle released
 Niall Ronan retired
 James Downey to  Glasgow Warriors
 Casey Laulala to  Racing Métro
 Quentin MacDonald to

2014–15 Pro12

Play-offs

Semi-final

Final

2014–15 European Rugby Champions Cup

Pool 1

References

External links
2014–15 Munster Rugby season at official site
2014–15 Munster Rugby season at Pro12

2014-15
2014–15 Pro12 by team
2014–15 in Irish rugby union
2014–15 European Rugby Champions Cup by team